Vahit Kirişci (born 4 December 1960) is a Turkish politician. He has been serving as the Minister of Agriculture and Forestry since 4 March  2022.

Career 
He graduated from the Faculty of Agriculture of Çukurova University. He completed his doctorate at the Cranfield University in England. He worked as part of the technical staff in the Ministry of Agriculture and Rural Affairs. He gave lectures as a lecturer at Çukurova University. He became associate professor in 1995 and professor in 2001. He published 55 articles, books, commission reports and papers,16 of which were in foreign languages. He worked as a manager in many non-governmental organizations. He is a 22nd and 23rd term Member of Parliament from Adana. In the 22nd term, he served as Deputy Chairman of the Turkey EU Joint Parliamentary Commission and as Chairman of the Agriculture, Forestry and Rural Affairs Committee of the Grand National Assembly of Turkey. He was re-elected as the Chairman of the same commission in the 23rd Term.

He was appointed as the Minister of Agriculture and Forestry upon the resignation of Bekir Pakdemirli on 4 March 2022.

Private life 
He is married and has three children.

References 

Living people
Çukurova University alumni
1960 births
People from Kahramanmaraş
Ministers of Agriculture and Forestry of Turkey
Members of the 66th government of Turkey